R. Leema Rose is an Indian politician and a previous Member of the Legislative Assembly. She was elected to the Tamil Nadu legislative assembly as a Communist Party of India (Marxist) candidate from Thiruvattar constituency in Kanyakumari district in 2006 election.

References

External links 
1. Affidavit submitted along with application for the 2006 TN State elections

People from Kanyakumari district
Communist Party of India (Marxist) politicians from Tamil Nadu
Living people
Women in Tamil Nadu politics
21st-century Indian women politicians
21st-century Indian politicians
Year of birth missing (living people)